Woodville School is a historic Rosenwald school building located at Ordinary, Gloucester County, Virginia.  It was built in 1923, and is a high
one-story, five bay, symmetrical frame structure.  It measures 63 feet, 6 inches, by 28 feet, 6 inches, and sheathed in white painted clapboard.  It was converted to residential use after 1942.  Also on the property are a contributing guesthouse or additional school building and a small shed.

It was added to the National Register of Historic Places in 2004.

References

Rosenwald schools in Virginia
School buildings on the National Register of Historic Places in Virginia
School buildings completed in 1923
Schools in Gloucester County, Virginia
National Register of Historic Places in Gloucester County, Virginia
1923 establishments in Virginia